Herbert Brün (July 9, 1918 – November 6, 2000) was a composer, pioneer of electronic and computer music, and cybernetician. Born in Berlin, Germany, he taught at the University of Illinois at Urbana-Champaign from 1962 until he retired, several years before his death.

Career
Brün left Germany in 1936 to study piano and composition at the Jerusalem Conservatory (later renamed Israel Academy of Music) in (then) Palestine with Stefan Wolpe, Eli Friedman and Frank Pelleg.  While in Palestine, he also worked as a jazz pianist.  In 1948, he received a scholarship to further his studies at Tanglewood and Columbia University through 1950.

His work as an electronic-music composer began in Paris in the late 1950s, at the WDR studio in Cologne, and at the Siemens studio in Munich. During the 1950s, he also worked as composer and conductor of music for the theater, gave lectures and seminars emphasizing the function of music in society, and did a series of broadcasts on contemporary music.

After a lecture tour of the United States in 1962, he was invited by Lejaren Hiller to join the University of Illinois Center for Advanced Computation for 1963-64, at the conclusion of which he was asked to stay on as a member of the faculty. In Illinois, Brün began research on composition with computers, which resulted in pieces for tape and instruments, tape alone, and graphics. His compositions from this period include Futility 1964 (1964) and Non Sequitur VI (1966). Non Sequitur VI was generated using the MUSICOMP programming language developed by Hiller and Robert Baker at the Experimental Music Studios.

Brün began programming in FORTRAN in the late 1960s as he pursued an interest in designing processes. This work resulted in Infraudibles (1968) and mutatis mutandis (1968). The latter was a series of computer graphics for interpretation by composer/performers.

From 1968–74, he co-taught courses at the Biological Computer Lab with Heinz von Foerster (Professor of Electrical Engineering, Physics, and Biology) on cybernetics, heuristics, composition, cognition, and social change. In 1974, the members of the class published the book The Cybernetics of Cybernetics.

In 1972, Brün created a new synthesis technique which generated new timbres by linking and merging tiny portions of waveforms. (Efforts along similar lines are described in the article Granular synthesis.) From 1980 on, he toured and taught with the Performers' Workshop Ensemble, a group he founded.

Brün was instrumental in helping the then fledgling Computer Music Association get started in the middle 1970s, helping host conferences at the University of Illinois in 1975, and again in 1987. He was invited to give the keynote address at their annual conference in 1985.

Brün was awarded an honorary doctorate from the Goethe University Frankfurt (1999), and the Norbert Wiener medal from the American Society for Cybernetics in 1993. He helped found the School for Designing a Society in 1993 and taught there through the year 2000. His awards and honors also include the SEAMUS Award for Lifelong Achievement (2000), and a prize from the International Society of Bassists (1977). In 1969, he was Distinguished Visiting Professor at Ohio State University. He was one of two participants from the United States invited by UNESCO to their symposium Music and Technology  (1970). He was Guest Professor invited jointly by the Hochschule der Künste and the Technische Universität Berlin (1978); Composer in residence at the University of Maryland, Baltimore (May 1982); Composer in Residence at the University of Missouri (Kansas City) (1983); and Guest Composer at the annual convention of the Percussive Arts Society, St. Louis (1987).

Brün's students at the University of Illinois were referred to, often pejoratively, as Brünettes. His notable students include Stuart Saunders Smith.

Life
Herbert Brün was married to Marianne Brün, an intellectual, writer, and teacher of social theory; she was the daughter of the famous German actors Fritz Kortner and Johanna Hofer.

Selected works 
Five Pieces for piano, Op.1 (1940–45)
Sonatina for viola alone, Op.12 (1950)
String Quartet No.2 (1957)
Anepigraphe (1958) (tape alone)
Klange unterwegs ('Wayfaring Sounds') (1962) (tape alone)
Trio, for flute, double-bass, and percussion (1964)
Futility 1964 (tape alone)
Sonoriferous Loops (1964) (chamber ensemble and tape)
Infraudibles (1968/1984) (optional chamber ensemble and tape)
Piece of Prose (1972) (tape alone)
Dust (1976) (SAWDUST No. 1) (tape alone)
More Dust (1977) (SAWDUST No. 2) (optional percussion and tape)
Dustiny (1978) (SAWDUST No. 3) (tape alone)
A Mere Ripple (1979) (SAWDUST No. 4) (tape alone)
U-TURN-TO (1980) (SAWDUST No. 5) (tape alone)
I toLD YOU so! (1981) (SAWDUST No. 6) (tape alone)
Sentences Now Open Wide (SNOW) (1984)
on stilts among ducks (1996) (viola and tape)

Publications 
 Brün, Herbert. Über Musik und zum Computer. Karlsruhe: G. Braun, 1971. Accompanied by a 10-inch LP recording.
 Computer-generated graphics. Computer Music Journal, Vol. 5, No. 2, summer, 1981.
 Brün, Herbert. My Words and Where I Want Them. Champaign, IL; London: Princelet Editions, 1990. 
 Brün, Herbert. Irresistible Observations, edited by Mark Enslin, Susan Parenti, Andrew Trull. Champaign, IL: Non Sequitur Press. 
 Brün, Herbert. Sighs in Disguise, edited by Mark Enslin, Susan Parenti, Andrew Trull. Champaign, IL: Non Sequitur Press. 
 Brün, Herbert. When Music Resists Meaning: The Major Writings of Herbert Brün, edited by Arun Chandra. Middletown, CT: Wesleyan University Press, 2004.  (cloth)  (pbk.)

Citations

Notes

References

  (cloth),  (paperback),

External links 
Herbert Brün website

Brün article: Technology and the Composer
Brün article: Teaching the Function of Time in Art
Articles and associated works

German composers
American male composers
Musicians from Berlin
University of Illinois Urbana-Champaign faculty
1918 births
2000 deaths
20th-century American composers
20th-century German musicians
Experimental Music Studios alumni
20th-century American male musicians
German emigrants to the United States